6111 is an aluminum alloy used for automotive paneling. Favorable characteristics include corrosion resistance and precipitation hardening.

References 

Aluminium alloys